Gabriela de la Garza (born October 3, 1976), is a Mexican television and film actress.

Filmography

Films

Television

References

External links 
 

1976 births
Mexican telenovela actresses
Mexican film actresses
Actresses from Mexico City
Living people